Viralimalai block is a revenue block in Pudukkottai district, Tamil Nadu, India. It has a total of 45 panchayat villages.

Villages of Viralimalai block 
1.	Agarapatti  
2.	Alangudi, Pudukkottai  
3.	Avoor  
4.	Boothakudi  
5.	Kalamavur  
6.	Kalkudi  
7.	Kasavanur  
8.	Kathaloor  
9.	Kodumbaloor  
10.	Komangalam  
11.	Kongudipatti  
12.	Kumaramangalam  
13.	Kunnathur, Pudukkottai  
14.	Lakshmananpatti  
15.	Madhiyanipatti  
16.	Mandaiyur  
17.	Maruthampatti  
18.	Mathoor  
19.	Meboothakudi  
20.	Meenaveli  
21.	Melapatchaikudi  
22.	Nadupatti  
23.	Nambampatti  
24.	Nangupatti  
25.	Neerpalani  
26.	Pakkudi  
27.	Pallandanpatti  
28.	Perambur, Pudukkottai  
29.	Poyyamani  
30.	Rajagiri, Pudukkottai  
31.	Rajalipatti  
32.	Sooriyur  
33.	Thengaithinnipatti  
34.	Thennambadi  
35.	Thennathirayanpatti  
36.	Theravur  
37.	Thondamannallur  
38.	Vadugapatti, Pudukkottai  
39.	Vanathirayanpatti  
40.	Velur, Pudukkottai  
41.	Vemmani  
42.	Vilapatti  
43.	Viralimalai, Pudukkottai  
44.	Viralur  
45.	Viruthapatti

References 

 

Revenue blocks of Pudukkottai district